The Government of Haryana has appointed Ashwin Johar, as Chairman of Foreign Investment and NRI Cell, Haryana, which would provide an Institutional mechanism for: Provision of guidance and advisory services for attracting foreign investment in the state and redressal of other problems faced by the NRI’s of Haryana domicile e.g. property, marital discord, and law and order issues etc.

The Foreign Investment and NRI Cell will be located in the Haryana State Industrial and Infrastructure Development Corporation (HSIIDC) Panchkula. While the HSIIDC is designated as the nodal agency for Investment related matters, the Home department will act the nodal agency for addressing grievances related to property, marital dispute, law and order, and other related social issues.

The Cell would also create its Web Portal "Connect Haryana" to act as the single point contact for NRIs & PIOs and also for building up the necessary database. The HSIIDC will undertake all necessary steps for development and updation of the website.
The Home department shall nominate a single point of contact to whom all relevant correspondence /grievances received in the Cell, in electronic or paper form, will be forwarded and monitored along with a status tracking facility to the person making such correspondence.

Advisory committee
An Advisory Committee is also constituted at the Apex level to consider related matter and review the action taken by the Cell from time to time. The Advisory Committee shall consist of the following:
 Manohar Lal Khattar, Chief Minister of Haryana 
 Industries Minister, Haryana – Member
 Principal Secretary to Chief Minister – Member
 Principal Secretary, Home – Member
 Principal Secretary, Industry and Commerce – Member
 Principal Secretary, Town &Country Planning – Member
 Principal Secretary, Public Relations – Member
 Chief Administrator, Huda – Member
 Director, Industries & Commerce – Member
 Managing Director, HSIIDC – Member Secretary

Non-official members

 R.K. Malhotra – Japan
 K.V. Rathee – Canada
 O.H.Narain – Netherlands
 Budh Parkash Jasuja – United States
 K.L. Sardana – United States
 Rajiv Chhabra UK

External links
 HarSamadhan Haryana Govt's online Complaints portal

References

Economy of Haryana
State agencies of Haryana
Indian diaspora
Government of Haryana
Diaspora ministries
Government agencies with year of establishment missing